Shama or Shema is a town with a fishing village, and is the capital of Shama district, a district in the Western Region of Ghana. The town lies about 20 km east of Sekondi-Takoradi, on the mouth of the Pra River. The town is home to Fort San Sebastian, in whose graveyard philosopher Anton Wilhelm Amo, the first African known to have attended a European university, is interred.

The town is situated in the Shama Ahanta East Metropolitan district and Shama constituency of the Western region of Ghana. The inhabitants of the town are mostly engaged in fishing and its related activities such as fish processing for local markets. Shama is the sixtieth most populous settlement in Ghana, in terms of population, with a population of 23,699 people.

Shama is the English name of the town, originally and locally called Esima.

References

Populated places in the Western Region (Ghana)